= Duveholmssjön =

Lake in Sweden

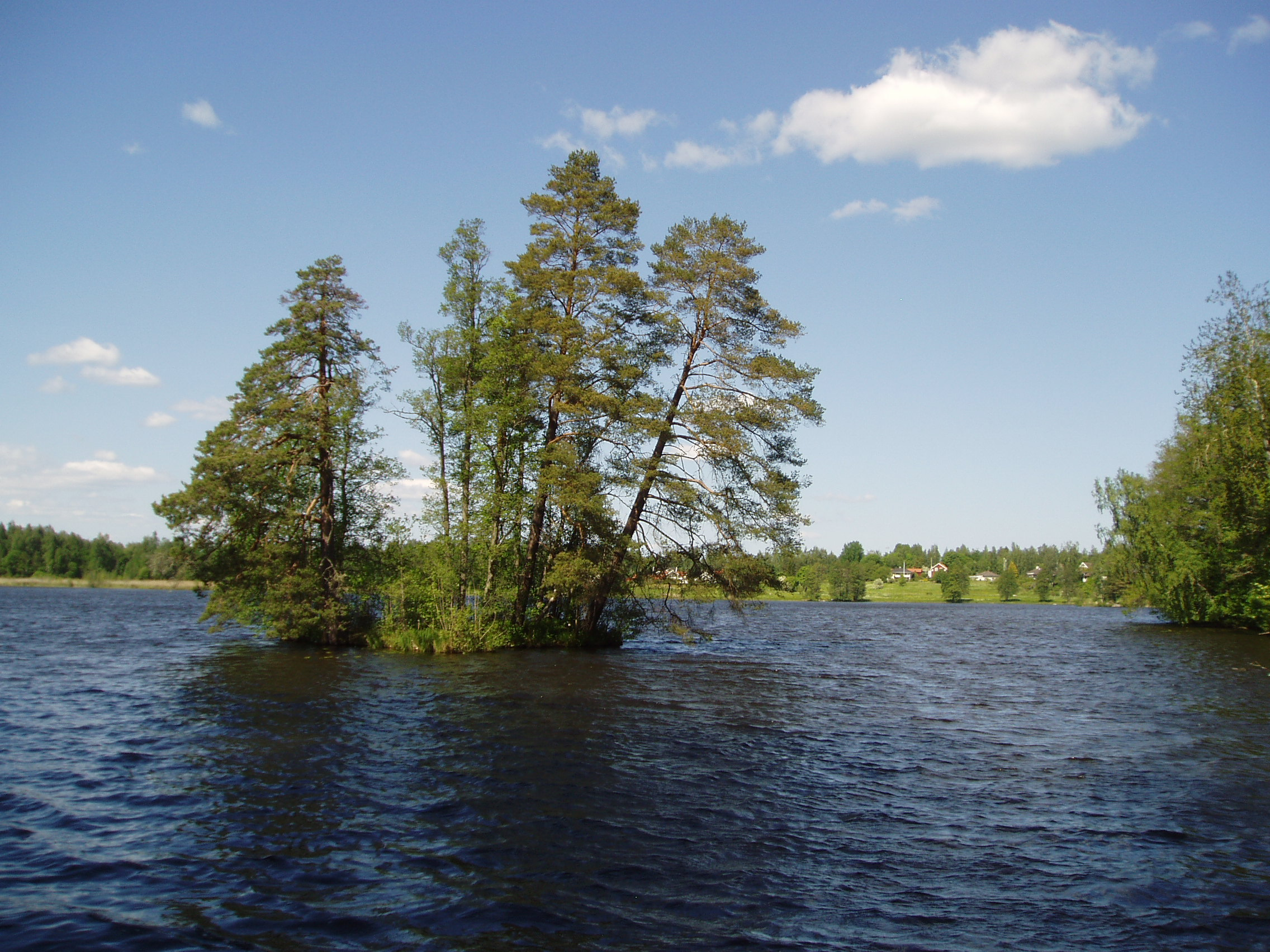
- View of Duveholmssjön from Duveholm mansion

- Location within Södermanland
- Coordinates: 58°58.75′N 16°10.52′E
- Basin countries: Sweden

Duveholmssjön is a lake in Södermanland County, Sweden.
